The Newton Boys is a 1998 American Western crime film directed by Richard Linklater, who co-wrote the screenplay with Claude Stanush and Clark Lee Walker. It is based on Stanush's 1994 book of the same name, which tells the true story of the Newton Gang, a family of bank and train robbers from Uvalde, Texas. The film stars Matthew McConaughey, who was actually born in Uvalde, Skeet Ulrich, Ethan Hawke, Vincent D'Onofrio, and Dwight Yoakam. It was filmed throughout Texas including the towns of Bertram, Austin, Bartlett, New Braunfels, and San Antonio.

Plot
A miscarriage of justice lands Willis Newton in prison, and he learns quickly that as a convict his only way up the social ladder is through having money. With two others, Slim and Glasscock, he carries out a bank robbery in broad daylight. Slim is caught when the three of them try to escape on horseback while the sheriff chases them in a car. Willis and Glasscock later find a bank director who buys the looted war bonds and sells them information on plenty of other banks. Henceforth, Willis and Glasscock rob banks at night and get away by car. Glasscock turns out to be an expert with nitroglycerin. Willis talks his brothers into supporting him, telling them that bankers are the worst crooks of all and thus, robbing them of their money would only mean that little thieves are stealing from big thieves. He also says that all banks are insured anyway and that the insurance companies ought to be thankful because they would not be able to sell any insurance if there were no bank robberies.

The Newton gang is very prolific, and some bankers prove to be the crooks Willis takes them for when they exaggerate their losses. Then, the insurance companies force banks to invest in enhanced safes, which can withstand nitroglycerin. Consequently, the Newton Gang goes to Toronto and ambushes a cash transport in broad daylight. Despite an elaborate plan, many things go awry, and the gang members are scarcely able to escape. Willis decides to become "legal", but the oil well he buys is a huge setback that costs him nearly all his money. In his despair, he goes so far as to tell his wife that God did not want him to be "legit". After that, he is easily lured into another criminal endeavor. He becomes very enthusiastic about a night-time train robbery. Unfortunately, Glasscock is not as good with a gun as he was with nitroglycerin. He confuses Dock Newton with a guard, panics, and shoots him. Willis needs to bring his wounded brother to a doctor, and this undertaking eventually blows their cover.

In the end, all the Newton brothers are finally arrested and sentenced.

Cast
 Matthew McConaughey as Willis Newton
 Skeet Ulrich as Joe Newton
 Ethan Hawke as Jess Newton
 Vincent D'Onofrio as Wylie "Dock" Newton
 Dwight Yoakam as Brentwood "Brent Glass" Glasscock
 Chloe Webb as Avis Glasscock
 Gail Cronauer as Ma Newton
 Julianna Margulies as Louise Brown
 Anne Stedman as Madeline
 Lew Temple as The Waiter
 Charles Gunning as "Slim"
 Ken Farmer as Ranger Frank Hamer
 David Jensen as William Fahy
 Bo Hopkins as FBI Agent K.P. Aldrich

Reception
The film received mixed reviews from critics, with a 65% rating on Rotten Tomatoes based on 40 reviews. The site's consensus states: "The Newton Boys uses a sharp cast and absorbing period detail to help make up for the frustrations of a story puzzlingly short on dramatic tension." Metacritic gave the film a score of 57 based on 20 reviews, indicating "mixed or average reviews". Roger Ebert gave the film two stars, writing "It's not an enormous cast, and yet somehow the Newtons are hard to tell apart--not in appearance, but in personality...the film as a whole seems drained of thrust and energy--especially compared to (Richard Linklater's) earlier films."

Notes

References

External links
 
 
 
 
 
 Morgenstern, Joe. March 27, 1998. "Prosperous Escapades Recounted In the Tale of 'The Newton Boys'." The Wall Street Journal

1998 films
1998 crime films
1998 Western (genre) films
1990s American films
1990s English-language films
20th Century Fox films
American crime films
American films based on actual events
American Western (genre) films
Crime films based on actual events
Films about bank robbery
Films about brothers
Films based on non-fiction books
Films directed by Richard Linklater
Films set in Texas
Films set in Toronto
Films set in the 1920s
Films shot in Austin, Texas
Films shot in New Braunfels, Texas
Films shot in San Antonio
Western (genre) films based on actual events